The Southern Military Territory refers to the jurisdictional territory within the colony of Italian Libya (1911–1947), administered by the Italian military in the Libyan Sahara.

Data
This military territory was below Italian Libya's four coastline provinces of Tripoli, Misurata, Benghazi and Derna. Administratively it was the only part of Italian Libya managed by the Royal Italian Army, and was divided in four military sections:
Homs
Murzuch - El Giof
Brach
Gat

The population was mostly Arab, with minorities of Berbers and blacks. Italians were concentrated in the administrative capital Hon, but there were a few even in the fortress Gadames.

In 1938 the Military Territory had 1,100,000 km2 with 50,889 inhabitants (nomads like the Tuaregs were not calculated as resident population).

The military territory expanded after concessions from Anglo-Egyptian Sudan and a territorial agreement with Egypt. The Kingdom of Italy at the 1919 Paris "Conference of Peace" received nothing from German colonies, but as a compensation Great Britain gave it the Oltre Giuba and France agreed to give some Saharan territories to Italian Libya.

The unratified Mussolini-Laval agreement of 1935 would have transferred the Aozou Strip from Chad, then part of French Equatorial Africa, to Italian Libya.

In 1931, the towns of El Tag and Al Jawf were taken over by Italy. Egypt had ceded Kufra district to Italian Libya in 1919, but it was not until the early 1930s that Italy was in full control of the place. In 1931, during the campaign of Cyrenaica, General Rodolfo Graziani easily conquered Kufra District, considered a strategic region, leading about 3,000 soldiers from infantry and artillery, supported by about twenty bombers.  Ma'tan as-Sarra was turned over to Italy in 1934 as part of the Sarra Triangle by the Anglo-Egyptian Condominium, who considered the area worthless and so an act of cheap appeasement to Benito Mussolini's attempts at empire. During this time, the Italian colonial forces built a World War I–style fort in El Tag in the mid-1930s.

Administrative capital Homs

During the colonial Italian Libya period, Hun was the administrative capital of the Italian Fezzan region, called Territorio Militare del Sud. Hun was the Italian military center of southern Italian Libya, and was not part of the national Fourth Shore territory of the Kingdom of Italy as Italian Tripolitania and Italian Cyrenaica were.

A small Libyan Italian community of 1,156 people lived in Hun, which was called Homs in the colonial years. In the 1939 census they were 3% of the total population of 35,316 in the city. They disappeared from Homs after Italy's loss of Libya in World War II.

In the 1930s the Italian government made some important improvements to the small town, including a connection to the coast via the new Fezzan Road.

Small Italian communities, mostly related to the military servicemen, lived even in Gadames and Gat. Someone of them were related to the Auto-Saharan Company ("Compagnie Auto-Avio-Sahariane"), Italian military units specialised in long range patrols of the Sahara Desert and headquartered in Homs.

World War II
The Military Territory of the South was occupied by allied forces during the Second World War. The French invaded from Chad and occupied Fezzan-Ghadames, the western part of the Military Territory of the South, in 1943. The British occupied the rest of Libya, including the other half of the territory which became part of Cyrenaica.

Demographics
According to the 1936 census, which allowed citizens to declare their ethnicity, Libyan Sahara's native population was made up of 55.7% Arabs, 21.8% Blacks, 14.1% Berbers, 6.9% Turks and 1.5% Others.

Notes

See also
Italian Libya
Aozou Strip
Italian North Africa

Italian Libya
Deserts of Libya
History of the Sahara
History of Fezzan